This article lists embassies accredited in Ireland. There are currently 67 embassies in Dublin.

Diplomatic missions in Dublin

Accredited (non-residence) embassies 
Resident in London

Resident in Paris

Resident in Brussels

Resident in Madrid

Resident in other cities

 (Lisbon)
 (Bern)
 (Lisbon)
 (New York City)

Former embassies 
  
  (closed in 2009)

Embassies to open 
  opening in 2023 
  opening in 2023

See also 
 Foreign relations of Ireland
 List of diplomatic missions of Ireland
 Visa requirements for Irish citizens

Notes

References

External links 
 Irish Department of Foreign Affairs

 
Foreign relations of Ireland
Ireland
Diplomatic missions
Diplomatic missions